This bibliography is a list of works from American author Danielle Steel.

Danielle Steel has written 190 books, including over 141 novels. Her books have been translated into 43 languages and can be found in 69 countries across the globe.

Novels
A list of all novels by Danielle Steel, linked to from Steel's official site, can be found here.

* Denotes New York Times Number 1 Hardcover Fiction Bestseller

Non-fiction
 Love: Poems (1984)
 Having a Baby (1984)
 His Bright Light (1998)
 A Gift of Hope: Helping the Homeless (2012)
 Pure Joy: The Dogs We Love (2013)
 Expect a Miracle (2020)

Picture books
 The Happiest Hippo in the World (2009)
 Pretty Minnie in Paris (2014)
 Pretty Minnie in Hollywood (2016)

Children's books

Max & Martha series
 Martha's New Daddy (1989)
 Max and the Babysitter (1989)
 Martha's Best Friend (1989)
 Max's Daddy Goes to the Hospital (1989)
 Max's New Baby (1989)
 Martha's New School (1989)
 Max Runs Away (1990)
 Martha's New Puppy (1990)
 Max and Grandma and Grampa Winky (1991)
 Martha and Hilary and the Stranger (1991)

Freddie series
 Freddie's Trip (1992)
 Freddie's First Night Away (1992)
 Freddie and the Doctor (1992)
 Freddie's Accident (1992)

References

 
Bibliographies by writer
Bibliographies of American writers
Romantic fiction bibliographies